Coordinadora Democrática (Democratic Coordinator) may refer to:

 Coordinadora Democrática Nicaragüense
 Coordinadora Democrática (Peru)
 Coordinadora Democrática (Venezuela)